The Ayer Keroh Lake is a lake in Ayer Keroh, Melaka, Malaysia.

History
Until 2019, the lake used to be the place for watersport activities.

Facilities
The lake offers various activities such as sailing, canoeing, boat riding or fishing. It also has a jogging path, playground and food stalls.

See also
 Geography of Malaysia
 List of tourist attractions in Melaka
 List of lakes of Malaysia

References

Ayer Keroh
Geography of Malacca
Lakes of Malaysia